The Badai Tugai Nature Reserve is located at the banks of the Amu Darya river in Uzbekistan. It was founded in 1971 on 6400 ha and is the only Nature Reserve in the republic of Karakalpakstan. The reserve contains riparian vegetation, including poplar forests and is home of 91 species of birds and 21 species of mammals. Among them is the rare Bactrian deer.

References 

Protected areas of Uzbekistan